Montenegro participated in the Eurovision Song Contest 2008 with the song "Zauvijek volim te" written by Grigor Koprov and Ognen Nedelkovski. The song was performed by Stefan Filipović. The Montenegrin broadcaster Radio i televizija Crne Gore (RTCG) organised the national final MontenegroSong 2008 in order to select the Montenegrin representative for the 2008 contest in Belgrade, Serbia. Six artists competed in the national final on 27 January 2008 where public televoting selected Stefan Filipović as the winner with 3,325 votes. His song, "Zauvijek volim te", was internally selected and presented to the public in a television special on 8 March 2008.

Montenegro was drawn to compete in the first semi-final of the Eurovision Song Contest which took place on 20 May 2008. Performing as the opening entry for the show in position 1, "Zauvijek volim te" was not announced among the 10 qualifying entries of the first semi-final and therefore did not qualify to compete in the final. It was later revealed that Montenegro placed fourteenth out of the 19 participating countries in the semi-final with 23 points.

Background 

Prior to the 2008 contest, Montenegro had participated in the Eurovision Song Contest as an independent nation one time since its first entry in its own right in  when they failed to qualify to the final with the song "'Ajde, kroči" performed by Stevan Faddy. The Montenegrin national broadcaster, Radio i televizija Crne Gore (RTCG), broadcasts the event within Montenegro and organises the selection process for the nation's entry. RTCG confirmed that Montenegro would participate at the Eurovision Song Contest 2008 on 19 June 2007. In 2007, the broadcaster organised the national final MontenegroSong to select both the artist and song that would represent Montenegro. For 2008, MontenegroSong was organised to select the artist with the broadcaster opting to internally select the song.

Before Eurovision

MontenegroSong 2008 
MontenegroSong 2008 was the national final organised by RTCG in order to select the Montenegrin representative for the Eurovision Song Contest 2008. 13 artists were invited by the broadcaster for the competition and the six artists that accepted to participate were announced on 13 January 2008. The final took place on 27 January 2008 at the Shass Disco in Podgorica, hosted by Dražen Bauković and Marija Vujović and was televised on TVCG 1 and TVCG SAT as well as broadcast online via the broadcaster's website rtcg.org. Each of the six artists performed two songs of their choice and Stefan Filipović was selected as the winner entirely by public televoting. 6,355 votes were received by the televote during the show. In addition to the performances of the competing artists, the show also featured guest performances by 2007 Montenegrin Eurovision entrant Stevan Faddy and 2008 Belarusian Eurovision entrant Ruslan Alekhno.

Song selection 
On 4 March 2008, "Ne daj mi da poludim" was announced as Stefan Filipović's Eurovision song. The entry was decided by a selection jury from four songs submitted by composers invited by RTCG. The song was later retitled as "Zauvijek volim te" and was presented during a television special on TVCG 2 on 8 March 2008. "Zauvijek volim te" was written by Grigor Koprov and Ognen Nedelkovski; the duo was also responsible for the Macedonian song in 2007. An English version of the song, "Never Forget That I Love You", was also recorded.

Promotion 
Stefan Filipović made several appearances across Europe to specifically promote "Zauvijek volim te" as the Montenegrin Eurovision entry. On 9 March, Stefan Filipović performed "Zauvijek volim te" during the semi-final of the Serbian Eurovision national final Beovizija 2008. On 4 April, Filipović performed during the BHT 1 show Konačno petak in Bosnia and Herzegovina.

At Eurovision
It was announced in September 2007 that the competition's format would be expanded to two semi-finals in 2008.According to Eurovision rules, all nations with the exceptions of the host country and the "Big Four" (France, Germany, Spain and the United Kingdom) are required to qualify from one of two semi-finals in order to compete for the final; the top nine songs from each semi-final as determined by televoting progress to the final, and a tenth was determined by back-up juries. The European Broadcasting Union (EBU) split up the competing countries into six different pots based on voting patterns from previous contests, with countries with favourable voting histories put into the same pot. On 28 January 2008, a special allocation draw was held which placed each country into one of the two semi-finals. Montenegro was placed into the first semi-final, to be held on 20 May 2008. The running order for the semi-finals was decided through another draw on 17 March 2008 and Montenegro was set to open the show and perform in position 1, before the entry from Israel.

The two semi-finals and the final were broadcast in Montenegro on TVCG 2 with commentary by Dražen Bauković and Tamara Ivanković. The Montenegrin spokesperson, who announced the Montenegrin votes during the final, was Nina Radulović.

Semi-final 

Stefan Filipović took part in technical rehearsals on 14 and 17 May, followed by dress rehearsals on 21 and 22 May. The Montenegrin performance featured Stefan Filipović performing on stage in a white shirt, black leather trousers and a black t-shirt with printed red hands which symbolised love and rage that the singer was experiencing with women as well as "friendship", "solidarity" and "stop". Filipović was also joined by four backing vocalists/dancers dressed in black and wearing red gloves. In the middle of the song, the backing performers caressed Filipović's face with their hands. The LED screens displayed black, red and white colours. The four backing vocalists/dancers performing with Stefan Filipović are Amira Hidić, Ana Kabalin, Martina Majerle and Mateja Majerle. Majerle would go on to represent Slovenia in the Eurovision Song Contest 2009 together with the group Quartissimo.

At the end of the show, Montenegro was not announced among the 10 qualifying entries in the first semi-final and therefore failed to qualify to compete in the final. It was later revealed that Montenegro placed fourteenth in the semi-final, receiving a total of 23 points.

Voting 
Below is a breakdown of points awarded to Montenegro and awarded by Montenegro in the first semi-final and grand final of the contest. The nation awarded its 12 points to Bosnia and Herzegovina in the semi-final and to Serbia in the final of the contest.

Points awarded to Montenegro

Points awarded by Montenegro

References

External links 
The announcement on RTCG website (in Serbian)
The six candidates
Montenegrin song title announced

2008
Countries in the Eurovision Song Contest 2008
Eurovision